Rafael Batlle Pacheco (1888, Montevideo – 1960) was a Uruguayan journalist.

Background 

He was a journalist on the newspaper El Día and a prominent member of the Uruguayan Colorado Party. Although he was never elected to office, his political positions were very influential.

He was a son of Matilde Pacheco and long-serving President of Uruguay José Batlle y Ordóñez. He was a brother of Lorenzo and César Batlle Pacheco.

See also 
 Politics of Uruguay
 List of political families#Uruguay

References 

1888 births
1960 deaths
People from Montevideo
Uruguayan people of Catalan descent
Uruguayan people of Scottish descent
Children of presidents of Uruguay
Colorado Party (Uruguay) politicians